is a Japanese footballer currently playing as a centre back for Hokkaido Consadole Sapporo.

Club career
Nishino made his professional debut in a 1–2 Emperor's Cup loss against V-Varen Nagasaki.

Career statistics

Club
.

Notes

References

External links

2004 births
Living people
Association football people from Hokkaido
Japanese footballers
Association football defenders
Hokkaido Consadole Sapporo players